Route 104 is an east/west highway on the south shore of the St. Lawrence River. Its eastern terminus is in Knowlton at the junction of Route 243 and its western terminus is in La Prairie at the junction of Route 134.

Municipalities along Route 104

 La Prairie
 Saint-Jean-sur-Richelieu
 Mont-Saint-Grégoire
 Sainte-Brigide-d'Iberville
 Farnham
 Brigham
 Dunham
 Cowansville
 Brome Lake

Major intersections

See also
 List of Quebec provincial highways

References

External links
 Official Transport Quebec Road Map (Courtesy of the Quebec Ministry of Transportation) 
 Route 104 on Google Maps

104